Saudi Arabia sent a delegation to compete at the 2008 Summer Paralympics in Beijing, People's Republic of China.

Medallists

Sports

Athletics

Men's track

Men's field

Powerlifting

See also
Saudi Arabia at the Paralympics
Saudi Arabia at the 2008 Summer Olympics

References

External links
International Paralympic Committee

Nations at the 2008 Summer Paralympics
2008
Summer Paralympics